The 1936 North American heat wave was one of the most severe heat waves in the modern history of North America. It took place in the middle of the Great Depression and Dust Bowl of the 1930s and caused catastrophic human suffering and an enormous economic toll. The death toll exceeded 5,000, and huge numbers of crops were destroyed by the heat and lack of moisture. Many state and city record high temperatures set during the 1936 heat wave stood until the summer 2012 North American heat wave. Many more endure to this day; as of 2022, 13 state record high temperatures were set in 1936. The 1936 heat wave followed one of the coldest winters on record.

June 1936

      
High temperatures began briefly in the Northeast from June 1 to 3. As the month went on, heat began to build in the Rocky Mountains and over the Southeast.

Western United States 
Grand Junction, Colorado saw five days above  with record highs set from June 18 through 20. Areas east of the Rockies in Colorado varied greatly, with Pueblo seeing one day above  (June 18) while Lamar saw eleven consecutive days with highs above .

Southeast and Midwest 
In the South, the heat started in the Gulf Coast states with Atlanta, Georgia seeing low to mid-90's in the early part of the month followed by Birmingham, Alabama seeing a string of mid- highs from June 6 through 10. Following this, intense heat began to build in the region by mid-month. From June 16 through 19, highs were in the upper 90's to near  in Birmingham. In a similar time frame, Huntsville, Alabama saw a string of five days above  with only one day not setting a new daily record high. In Mississippi, Jackson and Meridian both saw highs in the upper 90's while Greenville and Tupelo saw highs in the 100's.

On June 19, as the heat began to spread northward, multiple areas in the Midwest saw record daily highs, including St. Louis and Kansas City, Missouri, and Topeka, Kansas.

On June 20, Arkansas, Louisiana, Mississippi and Missouri all set all-time, monthly record highs: Corning, AR hit , Dodson, Louisiana hit , Greenwood, Mississippi hit , and Doniphan, Missouri hit . Dozens of other cities had daily record high temperatures, including Shreveport, Louisiana, Little Rock, Arkansas, and Memphis, Tennessee. The heat also began to spread northward, with St. Louis and Kansas City, MO also seeing daily high records.

On June 26, Nebraska set a new monthly record high as it hit  in Franklin. 

This day was particularly brutal, with many areas across the South and Midwest reporting record highs for the month. Springfield, Illinois hit  falling just short of the  record set in 1934. Galesburg, Illinois hit  and Lexington, Kentucky hit  which remains their hottest temperature ever recorded in June.

July 1936 
July started off relatively mild in many areas, with many areas in the Midwest seeing highs in the upper-80's to low-90's. However, areas in the Central Great Plains saw temperature's in the 100's with Topeka, KS, Omaha, NE and other locations seeing daily record highs. On Independence Day, July 4, this all quickly changed.

Heat Dome Forms Over Midwest 
On July 4, multiple areas centered around the Central Midwest saw temperatures spike into the 100's. Peoria, IL reached 106F, Sioux City, IA hit 111F (their highest temperature on record), Des Moines, IA hit 109F (falling one degree short of the record), Springfield, IL hit 105F, and Kansas City, MO hit 108F. All these areas saw their hottest Independence Day on record. That night, temperatures would only fall into the 70's.

On July 5, the heat persisted in these areas while spreading to others. Areas in Eastern Iowa had highs in the low to mid 100's with Burlington hitting 108 for the second day in a row. In Bismark, ND, the temperature hit 106F and in Aberdeen, SD it hit 108F.

On July 6, Steele, ND hit 121F, the highest temperature ever recorded in North Dakota. this occurred 5 months after the record low of -60F was set in the state. In Minnesota, the state's record high of 114F was also set in Moorhead. The heat continued to spread with Rockford, IL hitting 102F, Minneapolis, MN 104F, Grand Forks, ND 104F and Fargo, ND 104F (the cities record high). Bismarck, ND would also set its record high of 114F.

On July 7, the heat spread to the Great Lakes area. Milwaukee, WI hit 98F, Madison, WI 108F, Green Bay, WI 103F, Duluth, MN 100F, and Kalamazoo, MI 101F. The heat also spread south with Evansville, IN hitting 106F, and Lexington, KY hitting 101F.

On July 8, heat began to creep back into the Northeast with some areas having highs in the 80's and 90's. Elsewhere the heat dome expanded more with Indianapolis, IN hitting 104F, Fort Wayne hit 104F, South Bend hitting 106F (their second day above 100), and Louisville, KY hitting 103F. Detroit, MI hit 104F falling one degree short of the all-time record while Flint, MI hit 108F breaking the record.

On July 9, temperature's spiked in the Northeast. Baltimore, MD and Washington D.C. hit 103F and 104F, respectively. In the Philadelphia, PA area, temperatures rose to 103F. Syracuse, NY hit 103F and New York City hit 109F which remains their highest temperature ever recorded.

On July 10, the heat peaked in the Northeast with 4 states setting all-time record highs. It was 109F in Cumberland and Frederick, MD, 110F in Runyon, NJ, 111F in Phoenixville, PA, and 112F in Martinsburg, WV. Philadelphia, PA hit 104F which was the second highest temperature recorded in the city while Wilmington, DE hit 103F. Only the heat wave of 1918 surpassed this one in temperature. Washington D.C. hit 104F with the 1918 heat wave and one in 1930 surpassing it. However, Baltimore hit 105F and (although outside the Northeast) Lexington, KY both hit their all time high's of 108F. In the Midwest, this was many areas 7th consecutive day with highs above 100F. 

On July 11, the heat began subsided in the Northeast, though highs were still in the 90's. The heat temporarily stopped spreading but was still heavily impacting areas with Bismark, ND recording a low of only 83F. 

On July 13, the heat spread south through the Great Plains with Wichita, KS reporting a high of 101F, Fort Smith, AR hitting 106F, Tulsa, OK hitting 107F, and Oklahoma City, OK hitting 101F. Elsewhere, temperatures began to significantly rise with multiple areas hitting above 110F including in Wisconsin where the record high of 114F was set in Wisconsin Dells and Michigan where the record high of 112F was set in Milo. Multiple other cities in the area set record highs, including Grand Rapids, MI (108F), Kalamazoo, MI (109F), Green Bay, WI (104F), Duluth, MN (107F) and St. Cloud, MN (107F). However, Kansas City, MO had a high of 105F and a low of 72F which concluded over 100 hours of being above 80F. Also, it was reported in a newspaper that 50 people died every hour in the US from the heat this day. 

July 14 was the peak day of the heat wave for most areas with countless heat records broken. Indiana hit an all-time high of 116F in Congerville while areas in eastern Michigan matched the records set 6 days earlier. Louisville, KY hit a record high of 107F, Columbus, OH hit a record of 106F, and Minneapolis, MN hit a record of 108F. St. Louis, MO would hit 108F this day, but a heat wave in 1954 would later top that temperature. In Jefferson City and Columbia, MO, the high was 112F and 111F, respectively, but the low was only 81F. Rockford, IL hit 114F, Green Bay, WI hit 107F, Madison, WI hit 107F, Dubuque, IA hit 110F, Moline, IL hit 111F, Cedar Rapids, IA hit 109F, Burlington, IA hit 111F. It was 109F in Omaha, NE, 108F in Rochester, MN, 106F in South Bend, IN, and 106F in Indianapolis, IN with many locations in Ohio (and Fort Wayne, IN) falling short of the records set 2 years previously.    

On July 15, temperatures finally began to decline over most areas while other isolated areas still saw heat still increase. Missouri hit an all-time high of 115F in Clinton. Peoria, IL hit 113F setting an all-time record. Outside of 1936, the highest daily record was 107F in 1930. In Iowa, many cities tied the records set the previous day. However, in the Great Plains temperatures continued to rise as a new heat wave began to develop.

Latter part of July 
July was the peak month, in which temperatures reached all-time records—many of which still stood as of 2021. In Steele, North Dakota, temperatures reached , which remains North Dakota's record. In Ohio, temperatures reached , which nearly tied the previous record set in 1934. The states of Oklahoma, Kansas, and Nebraska, also experienced record high temperatures. The provinces of Ontario and Manitoba set still-standing record highs above .

August 1936 and afterwards 
August was the warmest month on record for five states. Texas, Arkansas, and Louisiana also set all-time high records. Many experienced long stretches of daily maximum temperatures  or warmer. Drought conditions worsened in some locations. Other states were only slightly warmer than average.

The heat wave and drought largely ended in September, although many states were still drier and warmer than average. Many farmers' summer harvests were destroyed. Grounds and lawns remained parched. Seasonable temperatures returned in the autumn.

Summer 1936 remained the warmest summer on record in the USA (since official records begin in 1895), until 2021. However February 1936 was the coldest February on record, and 5 of the 12 months were below average, leaving the full year 1936 at just above the average.

Effects
As many as 5,000 heat-related deaths were reported in the United States, and 780 direct and 400 indirect deaths in Canada.
Almost 5000 people suffered from heat stroke and heat exhaustion, particularly the elderly. Unlike today, air conditioning was in the early stages of development and was therefore absent from houses and commercial buildings. Many of the deaths occurred in high-population-density areas of Chicago, Detroit, St. Louis, Milwaukee, Cleveland, Toronto, and other urban areas. Farmers across the continent saw crop failure, causing corn and wheat prices to rise quickly. Droughts and heat waves were common in the 1930s. The 1930s (the Dust Bowl years) are remembered as the driest and warmest decade for the United States, and the summer of 1936 featured the most widespread and destructive heat wave to occur in the Americas in centuries.

See also
Dust Bowl
1936 North American cold wave

References

Further reading

External links
 US National Climate Data Center
 List of Droughts and Heat Waves
 NOAA Climate research center July 2006 records
 Look back: Relentless, withering heat wave of 1936 killed 479 in St. Louis (St. Louis Post-Dispatch)

North American Heat Wave, 1936
Heat waves in the United States
North American Heat Wave, 1936
North American
North American Heat Wave, 1936
North American
1936 heat waves
1936 disasters in Canada
Precipitation